Nikolaj is a Danish given name, derived from the name Nicholas. Many different ways of spelling the name have been approved in Denmark.

It may refer to:

 Nikolaj Abraham Abildgaard, Danish artist
 Nicolaj Agger, Danish professional football player
 Nikolaj Coster-Waldau, Danish actor
 Nikolaj Frederik Severin Grundtvig, Danish teacher, writer, poet, philosopher, historian, pastor and politician
 Nikolaj Koppel, Danish musician
Nikolaj Groth : (born in 1994) actor 
 Nikolaj Hansen (footballer, born 1987), Danish footballer for FC Roskilde
 Nikolaj Hansen (footballer, born 1993), Danish footballer for Víkingur
 Nikolaj Hübbe. balletmaster of the Royal Danish Ballet and former principal dancer at the New York City Ballet
 Nikolaj Nyholm, Danish serial technology entrepreneur and investor
 Nikolaj Znaider, Danish violinist

References

Danish masculine given names
Slovene masculine given names